Vangipuram is a village in Guntur district of the Indian state of Andhra Pradesh. It is located in Prathipadu mandal of Guntur revenue division. It forms a part of Andhra Pradesh Capital Region.

Government and politics 

Vangipuram gram panchayat is the local self-government of the village. It is divided into wards and each ward is represented by a ward member. The ward members are headed by a Sarpanch.

Education 

As per the school information report for the academic year 2018–19, the village has a total of 2 Zilla/Mandal Parishad schools.

See also 
List of villages in Guntur district

References 

Villages in Guntur district